Silverstein Properties, Inc. (SPI) is a family held, full-service real estate development, investment and management firm based in New York City. Founded in 1957 by Chairman Larry Silverstein, the company specializes in developing, acquiring, and managing office, residential, hotel, retail, and mixed-use properties. The firm is New York City's fifth-largest commercial landlord.

SPI's real estate business has been one of the largest investors in New York City real estate over the past fifty years, having developed, owned and managed more than 40 million square feet of office, residential, hotel and retail properties including the new World Trade Center, 30 Park Place (Four Seasons Private Residences New York Downtown), 120 Wall Street, Equitable Building, and Americas Tower.

Silverstein Properties is headquartered at 7 World Trade Center in Manhattan, New York City.

Company
Silverstein Properties has developed, owned, and managed more than 40 million SF (3.25 million m2) of commercial, residential, and retail space. Prior to joining the firm, SPI's executives and professionals developed in excess of 100 million SF (9.3 million m2) in the United States and abroad.

SPI's portfolio includes 13.4 million square feet of office, residential and retail properties and $10 billion of current development. Notable past and current projects include:
 Four Seasons Resort at Walt Disney World
 Four Seasons Hotel and Private Residences at 30 Park Place
 World Trade Center complex in downtown Manhattan (7 World Trade Center, 4 World Trade Center, 3 World Trade Center, 2 World Trade Center)
 One West End Luxury Condominiums
 120 Wall Street
 619 West 54th Street
 River Place (Manhattan)
 Equitable Building
 Silver Towers (Manhattan)
 Salmon Tower Building (Manhattan)
 1177 Avenue of the Americas
 529 Fifth Avenue 
 521 Fifth Avenue 
 530 Fifth Avenue 
 Ronald Reagan Office Building 
 711 Fifth Avenue 
 105 Madison Avenue 
 Beekman Tower
 11 West 42nd Street 
 520 West 41st Street 
 Disney Campus 125 West End Avenue 
 Disney Campus 320 West 66th Street 
 Disney Campus 147 Columbus Avenue 
 Disney Campus 149 Columbus Avenue 
 Disney Campus 77 West 66th Street 
 Disney Campus 47 West 66th Street 
 Disney Campus 7 West 66th Street 
 Disney Campus 30 West 67th Street 
 Stratos Office Center 
 Ethos 
 Qianhai Economic Zone Shenzhen, China 
 Several projects in Washington, D.C., Poland, and mainland China

Recognition 
Since 2012, SPI has been ranked 33rd of the "Best Places to Work in New York City" by Crain's.

References

External links 
 
 WTC site

Real estate companies of the United States
Companies based in New York City
World Trade Center